Touch Dance is a remix album by the British pop duo Eurythmics, released in May 1984 by RCA Records. It contains seven dance remixes of four tracks from the duo's 1983 album Touch, with four remixes by John "Jellybean" Benitez and three by François Kevorkian and Jay Mark.

Eurythmics vocalist Annie Lennox has said in interviews that she disliked the record, as it was too much of a commercial product and was put together by RCA Records with little involvement from her and fellow bandmember David A. Stewart.

Track listing

Personnel
Credits adapted from the liner notes of Touch Dance.

 Dean Garcia – bass
 Dick Cuthell – horns
 David A. Stewart – all other instruments, production
 Annie Lennox – all other instruments
 Jon Bavin – engineering
 François Kevorkian – mixing 
 Jay Mark – mixing 
 Linda Randazzo – engineering assistance 
 John "Jellybean" Benitez – mixing 
 Michael Hutchinson – mix engineering 
 Melanie West – engineering assistance 
 Steve Rapport – photography

Charts

References

1984 debut EPs
1984 remix albums
Albums produced by David A. Stewart
Eurythmics albums
RCA Records EPs
RCA Records remix albums
Remix EPs